"Love Days" is the fourth Japanese single released by Korean boy group The Boss, continuing their "Love Series" trend. It was released on December 7, 2011 on their Japanese label Sony Music Entertainment.

The title song is written by Kiryuin Sho of the band Golden Bomber; he later recorded his own cover version of it, which was released as a digital single on November 2, 2018 and included in his album Kojin Shisan, released on December 5, 2018.

Single information

The title track, "Love Days", was featured as the ending theme of the show Geino Bang+ in December 2011. The second track on the single, "Taiyō ga Noboru Basho", is an up-tempo song, while the third track included "Futari no Suki na Akanezora".

The single was released in three different versions, including a regular edition, limited edition A and limited edition B. Limited edition A includes a CD, a DVD and a booklet. Limited edition B includes a CD and a DVD with a special video about the group's life in Japan. First press regular edition releases are filled with trading cards, one out of six in each release.

Track list

CD

Limited edition A DVD

Limited edition B DVD

Chart performance

Release history

References

External links
 The Boss discography at Sony Music 
  

2011 songs
Japanese-language songs